India–Malaysia relations, also called Indian-Malaysian relations or Indo-Malaysian relations, are the bilateral foreign relations between India and Malaysia. India has a high commission in Kuala Lumpur, and Malaysia has a high commission in New Delhi and a consulate general in Chennai and Mumbai. Both countries are full members of the Commonwealth of Nations, Asian Union and G15. India and Malaysia are also connected by various cultural and historical ties that date back to antiquity. The two countries are on excellently friendly terms with each other seeing as Malaysia is home to a strong concentration of Indian immigrants. Mahathir Mohamad, the fourth and longest serving Prime Minister of Malaysia has Indian ancestry. On trade front their bilateral trade volume stands at $10.5 billion and is poised to reach $25 billion by 2020.

Following the visit by then Prime Minister Najib Razak in 2017, both India and Malaysia agreed to expand co-operation in new chapter in areas like infrastructures development and building of smart cities.
Many in the Indian government and their community feel the ties under 7th Malaysian Prime Minister Mahathir are decreasing since he favours Pakistan.

History

Ancient relations

Modern history 
Official diplomatic relations between both modern states was established in 1957, following the Federation of Malaya independence. Since then, both countries leaders has made several visits to each others.
 
In 2020, following comments from Malaysian Prime Minister Mahathir Mohamad speaking in opposition to the revocation of Kashmir's special status and the passing of the Citizenship Amendment Act, India imposed restrictions on Malaysian palm oil imports. But the ousting of Mahathir Mohamad from the Malaysian Prime Minister's seat in late March had blown for a fresh reconciliation of ties when Muhyiddin Yassin which had climbed to power in the face of huge domestic and regional scrutiny for conducting a bypass of election rights of citizens, had signed a record deal with India to import 100,000 tones of rice. In response to this, The Indian government lifted any sort of trade bans placed on the imports of Malaysian palm oil, thus subsequently increasing the import volume to an all-time high average of 500,000 tones per month.

Economic relations 
From 2000 to 2013, Malaysia is the 19th largest investor in India with cumulative FDI inflows valued at US$618.37 million. More than US$6 billion Malaysian investments also come in the form of telecommunications, healthcare, banking and construction projects. Trade between the two countries has increased from just US$0.6 billion in 1992 to US$13.32 billion in 2012. Beside that, Indian industrial, IT and healthcare companies also investing in Malaysia along with around 150,000 Indians (including 10,000 Indian expatriates) skilled and semi-skilled workers been employed in the country in the sectors of IT, manufacturing and banking. Malaysian companies as well participating in many infrastructure projects across different Indian states.

In 2017, India and Malaysia signed a new business deal amounting to U$36 billion with the exchange of 31 business memorandum of understanding (MoUs), the largest in the history of economic relations between the two countries. There is also a Malaysia India Business Council.

Education relations 
Between the 1960s and 1970s, around 30,000 Malaysian students have studied in Indian educational institutions, mostly in the medical field, with over 30% of the doctors in Malaysia today having been educated in India. The Indian government also provides scholarship to Malaysian students. Due to many Malaysian medical students' need to pursue their education in India, the Manipal Global Education Group agreed to set up their campuses in Malaysia.

Security relations 
Since before the formation of Malaysia, many of the country security forces members are trained in India. In counter to the growing Chinese influence, India has expressed to increase military and security co-operation with Malaysia.

See also 
 Raja Malaya Simha
 Malaysian Indians
 Malaysians in India
 Foreign relations of India
 Foreign relations of Malaysia

References

Further reading 
 
 Lokesh, Chandra, & International Academy of Indian Culture. (2000). Society and culture of Southeast Asia: Continuities and changes. New Delhi: International Academy of Indian Culture and Aditya Prakashan.
 R. C. Majumdar, Study of Sanskrit in South-East Asia
 R. C. Majumdar, India and South-East Asia, I.S.P.Q.S. History and Archaeology Series Vol. 6, 1979, .
 R. C. Majumdar, Suvarnadvipa, Ancient Indian Colonies in the Far East, Vol.II, Calcutta,
 R. C. Majumdar, Hindu Colonies in the Far East, Calcutta, 1944,  Ancient Indian colonisation in South-East Asia.
 R. C. Majumdar, History of the Hindu Colonization and Hindu Culture in South-East Asia

External links 

 High Commission of India in Malaysia
 High Commission of Malaysia in India

 
Malaysia
Bilateral relations of Malaysia
Malaysia
India